Antoine Rebetez (1897 – 28 January 1980) was a Swiss gymnast who competed in the 1924 Summer Olympics.

References

1897 births
1980 deaths
Swiss male artistic gymnasts
Olympic gymnasts of Switzerland
Gymnasts at the 1924 Summer Olympics
Olympic bronze medalists for Switzerland
Olympic medalists in gymnastics
Medalists at the 1924 Summer Olympics
20th-century Swiss people